Best of British is a British television documentary series, created by Robert Sidaway, Ashley Sidaway, Maurice Sellar and Lou Jones and produced by Robert Sidaway.

Narrated by John Mills and Anthony Quayle, the series comprised five seasons and sixty seven episodes all originally broadcast on BBC1.

Designed as entertainment for a broad audience, the complete series encompasses a comprehensive view of British cinema from the 1930s to the 1980s by examining a different theme and / or genre in each episode through the extensive use of film clips.

The series debuted on 22 April 1987. The final episode was broadcast on 31 March 1994.

The UK company Best Of British Films & Television was established due to the success of the series.

Production

Season 1
The creators had worked together in 1985 on the one hour documentary special Around The World In Seven Minutes and Four Times On Saturday, about the Pathé News and Movietone News cinema newsreels and their lead commentators Bob Danvers-Walker and Leslie Mitchell. The successful relationship established with Barry Brown (at the time Head of Acquisitions at the BBC) led to the pre-purchase of Season One, which was then made independently by Charisma Films.

Produced during 1986, Season One comprised ten episodes and featured films produced and distributed by the Rank Organisation over a fifty-year period from the 1930s to the 1980s. Produced by Robert Sidaway for Best of British Films & Television and Charisma Films, all the programs were written by Robert Sidaway, Ashley Sidaway, Maurice Sellar and Lou Jones and narrated by John Mills.

Commencing Wednesday 22 April 1987, the episodes were broadcast on a weekly basis at 7:35 pm. Each episode was 25 minutes in length, apart from Things That Go Bump in the Night (Episode 1.07) which was edited down to 19 minutes by the BBC due to the intense nature of the content for the early evening timeslot.

Book
A book based on Season One and titled The Best of British: A Celebration of Rank Film Classics was written by Robert Sidaway, Ashley Sidaway, Maurice Sellar and Lou Jones and published by Sphere Books in April 1987 to coincide with the broadcast of the series.

Wogan specials
Two specials of the television chat show Wogan were hosted by Terry Wogan to tie-in with the series and featured a number of British cinema stars, including John Mills, Stewart Granger, Peter Cushing, Kenneth Williams and Norman Wisdom. The first special was broadcast on Friday 22 May 1987 (duration 35 minutes) and the second special on Monday 25 May 1987 (duration 40 minutes).

Season 2

Season Two comprised sixteen episodes and continued the detailed look at films produced and distributed by the Rank Organisation. Produced by Robert Sidaway for Best of British Films & Television and Charisma Films, all the programs were written by Robert Sidaway, Ashley Sidaway, Maurice Sellar and Lou Jones and narrated by John Mills.

Production took place during late 1987 and 1988. During production of Season Two, the series theme music was recorded by the National Philharmonic Orchestra. Nicholas Raine arranged and conducted the sessions at CTS Studios in Wembley. The music was released by RCA in June 1987 with a Love Theme arrangement on the A side and the Main Theme on the B side. The orchestral version of the music was used on Seasons Two to Five.

The first five episodes were initially broadcast commencing on 10 August 1988.

Episodes

Season 1

Season 2

The remaining eleven episodes were broadcast between 11 January 1989 and 22 March 1989.

Season 3

Season 4

Season 5

References

External links

1987 British television series debuts
1994 British television series endings
1980s British documentary television series
1990s British documentary television series
BBC television documentaries
English-language television shows
Television shows set in the United Kingdom